This is a list of Nigerian films released in the 1970s.

Films

See also 

 List of Nigerian films

References 

Lists of Nigerian films by year
1970s in Nigerian cinema